Woodrow Paul Swancutt (July 4, 1915 – March 21, 1993) was a major general in the United States Air Force.

Biography
Swancutt was born on July 4, 1915, in Edgar, Wisconsin. He graduated from La Crosse Central High School in La Crosse, Wisconsin, in 1933 and attended the University of Wisconsin-Madison, where he was a member of the Wisconsin Badgers boxing team and was a national champion in 1939 and 1940. Swancutt married Kathleen Haza. They had three children and eventually divorced. As a civilian he served as vice president of Executive Jet Aviation. He died from heart failure on March 21, 1993, in San Antonio, Texas, and is buried at Arlington National Cemetery.

Military career
Swancutt originally joined the United States Army Air Corps in 1940. He was listed a second lieutenant and then, in 1943, a captain assigned to Bolling Field, D.C. in 1942-1943. During World War II Swancutt was a Boeing B-29 Superfortress pilot in the 40th Bombardment Group, which was the first B-29 unit to fly in battle. 

Following the war Swancutt was selected as a pilot on Dave's Dream to drop the nuclear weapon during Operation Crossroads. 

Later he was assigned as a squadron commander of the 509th Bombardment Group. In 1949 Swancutt was assigned to serve as chief of the Operations Division and Deputy Director of Operations at the headquarters of the Eighth Air Force. From 1952 to 1954 Swancutt served as the Director of Operations of the 7th Air Division. Later he served as deputy wing commander and eventually, in 1956, wing commander of the 42nd Bombardment Group. In 1957 Swancutt was named commander of the 91st Strategic Reconnaissance Wing. The wing would eventually be converted to the 376th Bombardment Wing, where he served as a commander from December 1957 to April 1959. Swancutt served as Director of Safety at the Headquarters of Strategic Air Command from May 1959 to September 1960. From 1962 to 1965 Swancutt served as commander of the 822d Air Division. It was then that he would become Deputy Director of Operations for Strategic and Defense Forces at the Air Force Headquarters. The following year he would be named director. Swancutt was also the steering and coordinating member of the Permanent Joint Board on Defense. In 1967 he was named Vice Commander of the Second Air Force. 

His retirement was effective as of August 1, 1968.

Awards 
In 1968, Swancutt received the Billy Mitchell Memorial Award.

Awards he received include the Legion of Merit with two oak leaf clusters, the Distinguished Flying Cross with oak leaf cluster, the Air Medal with oak leaf cluster, the Air Force Commendation Medal, the Presidential Unit Citation, and the Outstanding Unit Award.

References

1915 births
1993 deaths
People from Marathon County, Wisconsin
People from La Crosse, Wisconsin
Military personnel from Wisconsin
United States Air Force generals
Recipients of the Legion of Merit
Recipients of the Distinguished Flying Cross (United States)
Recipients of the Air Medal
United States Army Air Forces bomber pilots of World War II
University of Wisconsin–Madison alumni
Boxers from Wisconsin
Burials at Arlington National Cemetery
American male boxers
La Crosse Central High School alumni